Vatolakkos is the name of two villages in Greece:
Vatolakkos, Chania, in Platanias
Vatolakkos, Grevena in Grevena